Restrepia aristulifera is a species of orchid endemic to Venezuela.

References

External links 

aristulifera
Endemic orchids of Venezuela